Jaccard is a surname. Notable people with the surname include:

 Auguste Jaccard (1833–1895), Swiss geologist and paleontologist
 Fernand Jaccard (1907–2008), Swiss footballer
 James Jaccard (born 1949), American psychologist and social work researcher
 Marius Jaccard (1898–1978), Swiss ice hockey player
 Mark Jaccard (born 1955) Canadian economist and academic
 Jacques Jaccard (1886–1960), American director
  (born 1964), 1990 winner of the Swiss bike race Giro del Mendrisiotto
 Paul Jaccard (1868–1944), Swiss botanist and academic
 Richard Alonzo Jaccard (1918–1942), U.S. Navy ensign, USS Jaccard was named after him
 Roland Jaccard (1941–2021), Swiss writer and psychologist
 Francis Jaccard (1745–1862), a Vietnamese Martyr

See also
 Jacquard (disambiguation)